The Casa de los Cinco Medallones (English for:House of the Five Medallions) is a Plateresque style house which was built in 1540. It is located in Santo Domingo, Dominican Republic.

It is part of the UNESCO World Heritage Site "Colonial City of Santo Domingo".

Its name is due to the five Plateresque medallions that can be seen on its portal, these show five faces that could be that of Charles V, Holy Roman Emperor represented at different ages.

Since 1972, the house houses one of the two Numismatic museums of Santo Domingo. The other one is the main numismatic museum located in the headquarters of the Central Bank of the Dominican Republic.

See also
List of colonial buildings in Santo Domingo

References

Buildings and structures in Santo Domingo
Ciudad Colonial (Santo Domingo)
1540 establishments in the Spanish Empire
Houses completed in 1540
1540 establishments in North America
Plateresque architecture in the Dominican Republic
Renaissance architecture in the Dominican Republic